The Venice Cup is a biennial world championship contract bridge tournament for national  of Women. It is contested every odd-number year under the auspices of the World Bridge Federation (WBF), alongside the Bermuda Bowl (Open) and d'Orsi Bowl (Seniors). Entries formally represent WBF Zones as well as nations so it is also known as the "World Zonal Women Team Championship", one of three "World Zonal Team Championships".
It was first contested in 1974, as one long match between two teams, and has been concurrent with the Bermuda Bowl from 1985.

Alternatively, the Venice Cup is the trophy awarded to the winning team. It was donated by Italy when Venice hosted the inaugural contest. 

The most recent contest took place in September–October 2015 in Chennai (formerly Madras), India. The last event took place in 2017 in Lyon, France.

Structure

See a description of the identical "Senior Bowl" structure or a detailed account of the 2011 event (below)

1937 world championships

Austria won the first world teams championships in both open and women categories, conducted 1937 in Budapest, Hungary.

They were organized by the International Bridge League, essentially the predecessor of both the European Bridge League (est. 1947) and the WBF (1958). World War II practically destroyed the IBL and its nascent world championship tournament series. With Austria the leading nation at the card table, the 1938 Anschluss of Germany and Austria was a great disruption. The leading bridge theorist and mentor, Paul Stern was an outspoken opponent of Nazism who fled to England that year.

Another 1938 refugee from Austria to England, Rixi Markus (born Erika Scharfstein) was a member of both the 1937 champions and the 1976 Great Britain team that was defeated by the United States for the second Venice Cup.

Historical results

China is the only bridge nation outside Europe and the United States to win the Venice Cup. Following its third-place breakthrough in 1991, China finished second in 1997 and 2003, and third in 2007, before winning in 2009.

Every Venice Cup tournament has run alongside the Bermuda Bowl except in 1978, which was not a Bermuda Bowl year. Before 1985, however, the Open tournament was more frequent; from that time they have run together in odd years.

United States teams won the first three championships and they have won 10 of 17 including six as one of two USA teams.

The first two "tournaments" were head-on matches between representatives of North America and Europe, like the Bermuda Bowls of 1951 to 1957. The next two were open to one team from every WBF geographic zone. From 1985 the Venice Cup and Bermuda Bowl have run side-by-side in odd years, expanding together from 10 to 22.

Prior to the inaugural Venice Cup, there had been four Olympiad tournaments for women contested 1960 to 1972. The winners had been United Arab Republic, Great Britain, Sweden, and Italy. (After losing the first Venice Cup tournament in 1974, Italy would defend its Olympiad title in 1976 and lose the third Venice Cup in 1978.) (The United States won the first three Venice Cups 1974/76/78 but did not win any early Olympiad tournament.)

* Dennison–Williams in 1981 did not play enough boards to qualify for the title of World Champion
** Brito–Saad in 1981 did not play enough boards to qualify for third place

The third and fourth Venice Cup tournaments welcomed one team from each WBF geographic zone. On both occasions there were entries from Europe, North America, South America, and South Pacific; they were joined by Asia in 1978, Central America and the Caribbean in 1981. All of the entries were national teams, listed here by zone.
1978: Italy, USA, Argentina, Australia, Philippines
1981: Great Britain, USA, Brazil, Australia, Venezuela
Except for USA ahead of Italy in 1979, those were also the final standings. (Under the same rules, there were six teams in the 1979 Bermuda Bowl tournament because Asia and CAC both participated. A second team from Europe was added in 1981.)

1985

The fifth Venice Cup was not until 1985, when the two tournaments were permanently joined side-by-side in odd years with the same structure (like the Olympiad tournaments established in 1960). Since then, the numbers of teams entered have been identical except once.

For 1985 the champion teams from Europe and North America were granted slots in the 4-team semifinal knockout. One representative from every other zone, the host country team, and second teams from Europe and North America, played round-robin for the other two semifinal slots. As for all three renditions under that format, five other zones participated (not yet Africa) and there were ten teams in the field.
1985 Venice Cup, final standings
Great Britain (Europe 2)
USA 1 (North America 1)
France (Europe 1)
Chinese Taipei (Pacific Asia)
USA 2 (North America 2)
Australia (South Pacific)
Argentina (South America)
Brazil (host country)
Venezuela (Central America & Carib.)
India (Asia & Middle East)

1991 to date
After 1989, the championship fields were expanded from 10 to 16 teams. European and North American zones were granted four and three slots respectively, without special treatment for any. (The American Contract Bridge League allocated two places to United States teams and one to the winner of a playoff, if necessary.)

1991 Venice Cup participants by zone
Europe: Austria, Germany, Netherlands, Great Britain (1st to 4th in Europe)
North America: USA 1, USA 2, Canada
South America: Argentina, Venezuela
C. America & Carib.: Martinique
Asia & Middle E.: India
Pacific Asia: China, Chinese Taipei, Japan (host)
South Pacific: Australia
Africa: Egypt

All three teams from Pacific Asia advanced to the quarterfinal knockout stage, a very strong performance. China became the first team from outside Europe and the Americas to win a medal.

Through 1993, United States teams won seven and Great Britain two.

* Brunner – Scott-Jones in 1985, Caesar–Mögel in 1995, Farwig–Hackett in 2001, and Frey–Reess in 2005 did not play enough boards to qualify for the title of World Champion
** Shaomin–Wang in 1991, and Drøgemüller – Koch-Palmund in 2000 did not play enough boards to qualify for third place
*** Spinn–Widengren in 1991 and Fishpool–Hugon in 2001 did not play enough boards to qualify for second place

2009

Over 13 days in São Paulo, Brazil, beginning 30 August 2009, China became the first bridge nation outside Europe and North America to win the Venice Cup. Indeed, only China has won any gold, silver, or bronze medal in the tournament (see table, below).

The Chinese victory was decisive, culminating in a 220 to 148 IMP domination of USA1 in the two-day final match. Previously China led the seven-day 21-round-robin (France second) from which eight of 22 teams advanced to the knockout stage, then defeated Sweden 259–182 in the quarterfinal and France 245–221 in the semifinal. The 77-IMP and 72-IMP wins over Sweden and USA1 were the second and third biggest margins in the seven knockout matches.

Bénédicte Cronier–Sylvie Willard of France were the high-scoring players on all 22 teams during the round-robin, playing 15 of 21 matches and scoring 0.93 IMP per board. Hongli Wang–Ming Sun of China were second at 0.81 in 15 matches and their teammate pairs (six players on a "Team-of-four") ranked third and eighth.

2011

France won the 2011 Venice Cup by 196 to 103  in a two-day final match against Indonesia

France started with one-third IMP carryover from the 16-deal round-robin match, meaning Indonesia must score at least one IMP better on the 96 s of the final. France scored consistently well during the first three segments, to lead overnight by 126+ to 56, and Indonesia conceded after two of three segments scheduled for the next day.

Notable performances
This is the second Venice Cup for France and the 7th medal in 14 Venice Cup tournaments from 1985 to date, the time of equality with the Bermuda Bowl. Silvie Willard has played for all seven medalists; Véronique Bessis, Bénédicte Cronier, and Catherine D'Ovidio (Saul) six; and Danièle Gaviard (Allouche) five. Following the tournament, D'Ovidio and Willard moved up current ranks one and two among Women Grand Masters and their three frequent teammates moved into the top twelve.

The silver medal for Indonesia represents a sudden arrival among the stronger teams, having placed during the preceding decade no better than 9th (2009), just outside the knockout stage in the current format.

Preliminary
There were 22 national teams in the field, who represented the eight WBF zones as follows. 
The regular quota for Europe is six teams, seven at Veldhoven because the host country qualifies automatically.

Europe: France, Netherlands, Sweden, Germany, England, Poland, Italy —ranks 1 to 7 in the European championship
North America: Canada, USA 1, USA 2
South America: Brazil, Venezuela
Asia & Middle East: India, Jordan
C. America & Carib.: Trinidad & Tobago
Pacific Asia: China, Indonesia, Japan
South Pacific: Australia, New Zealand
Africa: Egypt, Morocco
The first stage was a full round-robin scheduled in advance.
Every team played 21 short matches of 16 deals, three daily.

The women of France, Germany, and the Netherlands have been strong teams for about two decades but this year they waged a close fight for the last two slots in the knockout, Netherlands and France surviving with Germany 7 VP short.
The two USA teams led the round-robin and selected quarterfinal opponents Indonesia, sixth, and Netherlands, seventh. England placed third and selected Sweden, fifth. That left defending champion China, fourth, to face France, eighth, a rematch of one 2009 semifinal.

In the quarterfinals, Indonesia and Netherlands both overcame 16-IMP carryovers (the maximum achievable head starts) to defeat the Americans by 33 and 28 IMP. England defeated Sweden to be the only preliminary leader who advanced, and France defeated China, 205+ to 197, in the only match that "went to the end".
France led by 15+ after five segments and extended the lead to 29+ IMP on the 84th deal (#20), but the champions yielded nothing more and cut the margin to 2+ on the 95th deal.
(The leader was known only to spectators, including local and internet commentators and presumably the third pair from each team.) Finally China defeated 3 one trick worth 50 points, while France doubled 4 and beat it two tricks, worth 300 points and a final margin of eight up from two IMP.

In the semifinals, Indonesia outscored England by 18 IMP on 96 deals to overcome 10.5 carryover. France outscored Netherlands by 21 to overcome 0.5 carryover.

While France won the Cup from Indonesia, the host Netherlands overcame 12 IMP carryover to beat England in 48 deals and win the bronze medal, 109 to 91.

So the preliminary eight, seventh, and sixth place teams had finished one, two, three on the victory stand.

2013

USA2 won the 2013 Venice Cup in Bali, Indonesia, defeating England by a score of 229 to 220.3 . The two-day final match of 96 s was unusually close: the margin, a fraction less than 9 IMP, is frequently exceeded on a single deal; China and France had won the 2009 and 2011 Cups by more than 70 and 90 IMP.

USA2 was the second of two United States entries in the field of 22: namely, Hjordis Eythorsdottir, Jill Levin, Jill Meyers, Janice Seamon-Molson, Jenny Wolpert, Migry Zur-Campanile; Sue Picus npc. England was represented by the same team that won the 2012 World Mind Sports Games: Sally Brock, Fiona Brown, Heather Dhondy, Nevena Senior, Nicola Smith, Susan Stockdale; Jeremy Dhondy npc, David Burn coach.

The Netherlands won another close match for third place, defeating China by 152 to 139. The bronze medalists: Carla Arnolds, Marion Michielsen, Jet Pasman, Anneke Simons, Wietske van Zwol, Meike Wortel; Alex van Reenen npc, Hans Kelder coach.

Jill Meyers now has four Venice Cup wins (after 1993, 1997 and 2007), Levin three (2003, 2007) and Seamon-Molson two (2003). Meyers is the first to win six world titles for women, as Nicola Smith would have been with an England victory. She has won five medals in Venice Cup tournaments, as have the Dutch women Arnolds, Pasman, and Simons.

2015
In 2015 the Venice Cup was held in Chennai (formerly Madras), India. It was won by France, with USA2 taking silver. England beat the Netherlands in the bronze medal play-off.

2017
In 2017 the Venice Cup was held in Lyon, France. It was won by China, with England taking silver. Sweden beat Poland in the bronze medal play-off.

2019
In 2019 the Venice Cup was held in Wuhan, China. It was won by Sweden, with China taking silver. England beat Netherlands in the bronze medal play-off.

2022
In 2022 the Venice Cup was held in Salsomaggiore, Italy. It was won by Sweden, with Turkiye taking silver. England beat Poland in the bronze medal play-off.

Hosts
1974 Venice, Italy
1976 Monte Carlo, Monaco
1978 New Orleans, United States
1981 New York, United States
1985 San Paolo, Brazil
1987 Ocho Ríos, Jamaica
1989 Perth, Australia
1991 Yokohama, Japan
1993 Santiago, Chile
1995 Beijing, China
1997 Hammamet, Tunisia
2000 Southampton, Bermuda
2001 Paris, France
2003 Monte Carlo, Monaco
2005 Estoril, Portugal
2007 Shanghai, China
2009 San Paulo, Brazil
2011 Veldhoven, Netherlands
2013 Bali, Indonesia
2015 Chennai, India
2017 Lyon, France
2019 Wuhan, China
2022 Salsomaggiore, Italy

Zones and nations
See the version at "Senior Bowl".

See also
 World Team Olympiad
 2021 World Bridge Team Championships

Notes

References

Citations

External links
Women program top page at the World Bridge Federation
World Championships program overview at the World Bridge Federation

Contract bridge world competitions